Kailasho Devi Saini (born 4 April 1962) is a political and social worker and a Member of Parliament elected from Kurukshetra constituency in the Indian state of Haryana being an Indian National Lok Dal candidate.

Early life and education 
Kailasho was born in Pratapgarh, Kurukshetra. She is married to Om Nath and has a daughter. Kailasho is a M.A in Physical Education and History.

Career
Kailasho has been working to solve the problems of the common man in the districts of Yamunanagar, Kurukshetra and Kaithal in Haryana. She has won many awards for participating in cultural activities during student life.

Interests
Kailasho's interests include practising yoga; listening to music, meditating, and jogging.

References

India MPs 1998–1999
Women in Haryana politics
Indian National Lok Dal politicians
Articles created or expanded during Women's History Month (India) - 2014
1962 births
Living people
20th-century Indian women politicians
20th-century Indian politicians
People from Kurukshetra district
India MPs 1999–2004
Lok Sabha members from Haryana
Bharatiya Janata Party politicians from Haryana
21st-century Indian women politicians